David J. Arnold Jr. (December 7, 1971 – January 17, 2021) was a Pennsylvania state senator who represented the 48th district, which includes all of Lebanon County and portions of Dauphin and York counties. He was a member of the Republican Party and previously served as the district attorney of Lebanon County. Arnold was a senator from January 2020 until his death in January 2021.

Personal life
Arnold was a lifelong resident of Lebanon County, Pennsylvania and graduated from Cedar Crest High School in 1989. He later earned a criminal justice degree from Kutztown University. Soon after graduating from Widener University School of Law in 1996 with a JD degree, Arnold passed the bar exam.

In late October 2019, Arnold was diagnosed with a malignant brain tumor and underwent successful surgery two days later at the Penn State Milton S. Hershey Medical Center to have it removed. According to a post on his campaign's Facebook page, additional treatment would be needed, and he would be off work and the campaign trail for a brief period after doctors had given him an excellent prognosis for full recovery. He died at his home on January 17, 2021, at age 49.

District attorney

Arnold worked within the district attorney's office from 1997 to 2002 and four years in private practice before being elected in 2005 as the district attorney of Lebanon County. He was president of the Pennsylvania District Attorney's Association from 2016 to 2017.

Pennsylvania Senate
After Mike Folmer resigned as state senator from Pennsylvania's 48th district in September 2019, a special election to fill the position was scheduled for January 14, 2020. Arnold announced in early October 2019 that he was seeking the associated Republican nomination. Running against at least seven other Republicans, Arnold was chosen by a state Republican committee to be the party's nominee. He won the special election against Democratic nominee Michael Schroeder with nearly two-thirds of the vote. Arnold was sworn in to office on January 29, 2020.

The state senator salary is less than half of what Arnold had been making as a district attorney, and he planned to make up the difference with a side job in a private law practice, which other lawyer-legislators are reported to do. Arnold said his taking the job was not for monetary purposes, and that he would not sign up for the state's traditional pension plan, for which other new state employees are not eligible.

Arnold was one of 75 members of Pennsylvania's congressional delegation to sign a letter to the state's U.S. congress members on December 4, 2020, regarding an election review for the 2020 presidential election. The letter identifies election-related legal protections its signers believe were undermined, and asks that Congress "reject electoral votes that are  not 'regularly  given' or 'lawfully  certified'", as they are enabled to do by federal law. Arnold signed another letter to the state's attorney general the same day that requested a review of state policies and procedures during the 2020 presidential election, and sought related reviews and recommendations.

References

External links
State Senator Dave Arnold
Campaign website
Campaign website on Facebook

1971 births
2021 deaths
20th-century American lawyers
21st-century American lawyers
21st-century American politicians
County district attorneys in Pennsylvania
Deaths from brain cancer in the United States
Kutztown University of Pennsylvania alumni
Pennsylvania lawyers
People from Lebanon County, Pennsylvania
Republican Party Pennsylvania state senators
Widener University School of Law alumni